Bruni Löbel (born Brunhilde Melitta Löbel; 20 December 1920 – 27 September 2006) was a German stage, film and television actress. She was married to the composer Gerhard Bronner and the actor Holger Hagen. Löbel appeared in a number of television serials, including Timm Thaler, Storm of Love and Forsthaus Falkenau.

Selected filmography
 Front Theatre (1942)
 Love Letters (1944)
 Quax in Africa (1947)
 No Place for Love (1947)
 Trouble Backstairs (1949)
 Don't Play with Love (1949)
 Unknown Sender (1950)
 The Big Lift (1950)
 Father Needs a Wife (1952)
 Irene in Trouble (1953)
 Secrets of the City (1955)
 Beloved Enemy (1955)
 Special Delivery (1955)
 The Crammer (1958)
 The Beautiful Adventure (1959)
 Almost Angels (1962)
 Kurzer Prozess (1967)
  (1975, TV film)
 Polizeiinspektion 1 (1977–1988, TV series)
 Timm Thaler (1979, TV miniseries)
 Ich heirate eine Familie (1983–1986, TV series)
  (1988, TV series)
 Forsthaus Falkenau (1989–2006, TV series)
 Storm of Love (2006, TV series)

References

Bibliography
 Palmer, R. Barton. Shot on Location: Postwar American Cinema and the Exploration of Real Place. Rutgers University Press, 2016.

External links

1920 births
2006 deaths
German stage actresses
German film actresses
People from Chemnitz
20th-century German actresses
German television actresses